Çürüksulu Mahmud Pasha (1864 – 31 July 1931), was an Ottoman army general and statesman of ethnic Georgian background.

Early life and career 

Mahmud Pasha was born in 1864 in Kobuleti, then part of the Ottoman Empire known by its Ottoman name Çürüksu, in the present-day Adjara region of the Republic of Georgia.

After 1909, Mahmud Pasha took part in the modernization of the Ottoman army under the auspices of German High Command. He served as the Minister of Public Works in the CUP government.

When World War I broke out in 1914, Mahmud Pasha opposed the Ottoman participation in view of the unpreparedness of the armed forces. He was known as an outspoken but a respected figure in the Committee of Union and Progress (CUP). Later in the war, Mahmud Pasha served as the Minister of the Navy in the CUP cabinet of Talaat Pasha. 

In 1914, Mahmud Pasha's candidacy was put forward by the Sultan to serve in the Ottoman Senate (Ayan Meclisi). After the defeat of the Ottoman Empire in WW I, Mahmud Pasha led the commission to negotiate peace. Mahmud Pasha's support for territorial concessions to reach an agreement with Armenians in 1919 drew criticism from Mustafa Kemal Atatürk.

On March 22, 1920, Mahmud Pasha was among the few CUP members arrested and sent by the British authorities for a tribunal in Malta. Upon their repatriation in 1921, he returned to Turkey. Mahmud Pasha died in Istanbul on July 31, 1931.

References

1864 births
1931 deaths
Ottoman generals
Georgians from the Ottoman Empire
People from Kobuleti
Government ministers of the Ottoman Empire
Committee of Union and Progress politicians
Ottoman people of World War I